The Chaotian is a proposed time division of the geologic time scale. First proposed in 2010 as an eon, it is named after Chaos, the primeval void in Greek mythology. This proposal defines the Chaotian eon as a solar system wide time between the initiation of planetary formation and the hypothesised collision of the Protoplanet Theia with the proto-Earth. 

A revised proposal in 2012 suggested the Chaotian as the first era of the Hadean representing the time between the formation of the solar system c. 4.567 Ga and the oldest preserved crustal material on Earth, a c. 4.404 Ga detrital zircon from the Jack Hills of the Narryer Terrane in Western Australia.

 neither proposal had been adopted or officially ratified by the International Union of Geological Sciences.

Subdivisions 
The original proposal in 2010 divided the Chaotian into two eras and four periods. No numerical upper age limits were provided, only the younger age limit of ~4.5 Ga for the boundary between the proposed Chaotian and Hadean boundary. 

The revised proposal in 2012 did not subdivide the proposed Chaotian era (of the Hadean eon) into periods.

See also 

 Age of the Earth
 Formation and evolution of the Solar System
 Geologic time scale

References 

Geological eons
Geological eras
Hadean